Karyolysidae is a family of parasitic alveolates of the phylum Apicomplexa.

References

Apicomplexa families